Blackout in the Square Root of Soul is an album by trombonist Craig Harris and Tailgater's Tales which was recorded in 1987 and released on the JMT label.

Reception
The AllMusic review by Brian Olewnick called it "An ambitious but ultimately unsuccessful venture".

Track listing
All compositions by Craig Harris
 "Blackout in the Square Root of Soul" - 9:55  
 "Phase I - Phase II - Generations" - 3:55  
 "Free I" - 7:09  
 "Love Joy" - 6:00  
 "Blues Dues" - 2:25  
 "Dingo" - 4:53  
 "Awakening Ancestors" - 5:22

Personnel
Craig Harris - trombone, didgeridoo, vocals
Don Byron - clarinet, bass clarinet
Eddie Allen - trumpet
Jean-Paul Bourelly - guitar
Clyde Crinner - keyboards
Anthony Cox - bass
Ralph Peterson Jr. - drums

References 

1988 albums
Craig Harris albums
JMT Records albums
Winter & Winter Records albums